Aymen Toumi (born 11 July 1990) is a Tunisian handball player for Montpellier Handball and the Tunisian national team.

He competed for the Tunisian national team at the 2012 Summer Olympics in London, where the Tunisian team reached the quarterfinals.  He was also part of the 2016 Olympic team.

Honours

National team
African Championship
 Winner: 2012 Morocco

Junior World Championship
 Bronze Medalist: 2011 Greece

Club
African Super Cup
 Winner: 2013 Sousse
 Runners-up: 2011 Yaoundé
African Champions League
 Winner: 2010 Casablanca
 Runners-up: 2011 Kaduna
African Cup Winners' Cup
 Winner: 2012 Tunis
 Bronze medalist: 2013 Hammamet
Tunisia National League
 Winner: 2011
Tunisia National Cup
 Winner: 2010

References

External links

1990 births
Living people
People from Sousse
Tunisian male handball players
Olympic handball players of Tunisia
Handball players at the 2012 Summer Olympics
Expatriate handball players
Tunisian expatriates in France
Montpellier Handball players
Handball players at the 2016 Summer Olympics
20th-century Tunisian people
21st-century Tunisian people